Sagopshi (Soaghapče) is a rural locality (a selo) in Malgobeksky District of the Republic of Ingushetia, Russia. Population:

History

Formation of the Village (1863 - 1874)
In 1863, two new settlements appeared in the mountainous area of Malaya Kabarda, on the river Psygobzhe. The first settlement was called Tsokalo Bokova (Upper Sagopsh) and was inhabited mainly by settlers from Eldarkhan-kala. The second settlement was called Alamkacha Gatagazhev (Lower Sagopsh) and was populated by settlers from the Tara Valley (Abrekovo village).

In 1865, the settlement of Tsokalo Bokov was abandoned due to the migration of its inhabitants to Turkey, and was soon re-populated by the Orstkhoys who remained in their homeland. They gave the settlement a new name, New Akh-Barza.

In 1874, as a result of forced eviction to the plain and the unification of two settlements, the modern village of Sagopshi was formed.

Period of Deportation and Renaming (1944 - 1957)
During the period of the deportation of Chechens and Ingush and the abolition of the Chechen-Ingush Autonomous Soviet Socialist Republic (ASSR), the village was called Nogzard and was part of the North Ossetian Autonomous Soviet Socialist Republic.

Return to the Original Name (1958 - present)
In 1958, the settlement was returned to its former name, Sagopshi.

Geography
The village of Novy Redant is situated in the Alkhanchurt Valley, on the northern slope of the Sunzha Range. It is located 16 km southeast of the district center of the city of Malgobek and 48 km northwest of the city of Magas.

The nearest settlements to Novy Redant include the city of Malgobek to the north, the village of Yuzhnoye to the northeast, the village of Zyazikov-Yurt to the east, the village of Nizhniye Achaluki to the southeast, and the villages of Psedakh and Inarki to the southwest.

Demographics

Ethnic composition:

others

Notable people 
 Sulumbek of Sagopshi — Ingush abrek

References

Bibliography 
 

Rural localities in Ingushetia